Pynsent is a surname. Notable people with the surname include:

William Pynsent (disambiguation), multiple people
Pynsent baronets, County of Wiltshire, England